Zhangpu County is a county of Zhangzhou prefecture-level city in far southern Fujian province, People's Republic of China. The county seat is located in the town of Sui'an.

Zhangpu is bordered by the Longhai City in the north, the counties of Pinghe and Yunxiao in the west, and the Taiwan Strait in the south and east.

Administration

Besides Sui'an, Zhangpu oversees 16 other towns: 
Fotan
Chihu
Jiuzhen
Duxun
Xuemei
Gongfu
Changqiao
Qianting
Shentu
Pantuo
Maping
Shiliu
Shaxi
Da'nanban
Liu'ao
Gulei

The last two (Liu'ao and Gulei) share names with the long peninsulas where they are situated, which project into the Taiwan Strait to form large bays.

There are also four townships: Nanpu, Chitu, Huxi and Chiling. The latter two are protected ethnic (minority) townships, both for the She people.

Transportation
The major Shenyang–Haikou coastal expressway cuts through the county, keeping about midway between the coast and the old China National Highway 324.

The Xiamen–Shenzhen Railway runs through Zhangpu County; its Zhangpu Railway Station is located a few kilometers to the west of the county seat.

Historical sites

In Huxi She Township there is a fortified compound called Zhaojiabao, where a party of Southern Song royals in flight from the Mongol invaders of the late 13th century are said to have taken up a residence long in term and low in profile. With the Ming restoration of Han Chinese ethnic supremacy to the empire some ninety years and five generations later, the Zhao family revealed their pedigree and the compound received its current name.

Zhaojiabao has its own exit right on the Shenyang—Haikou expressway, about 40 minutes south of downtown Zhangzhou (i.e. of Zhangzhou' central urban district, Xiangcheng).

Another fortified compound, Yianbao, dating from the Kangxi era (1687) is located in the same Huxi She Autonomous Township as well.

The ruins of the Liu'ao Fortress (or ) are located near the tip of the Liu'ao Peninsula. The fortress  - a contemporary of the better known (and much better preserved - or restored) Chongwu Fortress in Hui'an County - was constructed in 1388 by the Hongwu Emperor's general Zhou Dexing.

Tulou

Although most of the famous Fujian Tulou are located in Fujian's interior (Nanjing County, Yongding County, and surrounding areas), there are a few tulou structures in Zhangpu County as well. According to a 2001 survey of Fujian's tulou, out of the province's 3733 tulou known to the researchers, 125  were located within Zhangpu County. Among them were 60 round tulou (out of the total of 1193 such structures in the province), 48 rectangular ones, and 17 of other types.

A characteristic feature of the tulou of Zhangpu County (and of the coastal Fujian in general) was the use of granite blocks for the lower part of the wall, as opposed to boulders/cobblestones which were used for a similar purpose in Fujian's interior.

Although the local folk tradition may claim greater antiquity for some tulou elsewhere, several of the oldest tulou whose age is documented are located in Zhangpu county. According to Huang Hanmin, the oldest currently known construction date for any of China's tulou is 1558 - which is the date (Year 37 of the Jiajing era) that appears above the main gate of Yidelou, a rectangular tulou in Makeng Village, Sui'an Town, Zhangpu County. It is a three-storey rectangular compound with walls 1.3 m thick; the  compound is surrounded by an elliptic wall 1.6 m tall. It was damaged by bombs dropped from a Japanese aircraft in 1934.

Several more tulou of comparable age (all of them of the rectangular type) are found within Zhangpu County as well. Merely two years "younger" than Yidelou is another three-storey rectangular tulou, Yiyanlou, located in Guotian Village of Xiamei  Town, Yiyan Lou and dated 1560 (Jiajing 39) by a similar door inscription. In Yuntou Village of the same town,  Qingyunlou is dated 1569 (Longqing 3). Yanhailou in Tanzitou Village (or ), Jiu Town dates from 1585, and the construction of Wanbilou, which is located inside the Zhaojiabao (see above) started in 1600.

Out of the 56 "exemplary tulou" listed in Huang Hanmin's monograph, 6 are in Zhangpu County. One of them, Jinjiang Lou,

located in Jinjiang village of Shentu Town, was built in 1791-1803, and consists of 3 concentric rings. It is one of the few tulou located in the immediate proximity (a few kilometers) of Fujian's sea coast.

Notable people 

Huang Daozhou, scholar and calligrapher during the Ming Dynasty
Lin Hejie, painter

Climate

Notes

References

County-level divisions of Fujian
Song dynasty
Yuan dynasty
Zhangzhou